TWA Flight 541 was a domestic passenger flight hijacked in the United States by Robin Oswald in an attempt to free Garrett Brock Trapnell, who was a prisoner at the United States Penitentiary, Marion (USP Marion).  The hijacking was successfully resolved when a Federal Bureau of Investigation (F.B.I.) negotiating team had her release the passengers and then surrender.

Background

On January 29, 1972, Garrett B. Trapnell hijacked a TWA plane flying from Los Angeles to New York. He demanded $306,800, the release of the imprisoned Angela Davis and a conversation with President Nixon. The hijacking was resolved when Trapnell was disarmed after being shot by an F.B.I. agent who pretended to be a negotiator.

On May 24, 1978, Trapnell's friend, 43-year-old Barbara Ann Oswald, a US Army staff sergeant on leave, hijacked a Saint Louis based charter helicopter and forced the pilot to land in the yard at United States Penitentiary, Marion. While landing the aircraft, the pilot, Vietnam War veteran Allen Barklage, struggled with Oswald and managed to wrestle the gun away from her. Barklage then shot and killed Oswald, thwarting the escape.

Incident

On December 21, 1978 Robin Oswald, the 17-year-old daughter of Barbara Annette Oswald, hijacked TWA Flight 541 and demanded Trapnell be freed or she would detonate dynamite strapped to her body. She was remembered by the hostages aboard the flight as a "beautiful" but serious girl, never showing alarm at her actions.

FBI negotiators were able to free the hostages and have Oswald surrender with no injuries or deaths. The bomb that was strapped to her chest later emerged to be railroad flares wired to what appeared to be a doorbell.  Robin Oswald was charged as a juvenile with charges not being announced as is the law in Illinois.

Aftermath
Garrett B. Trapnell died in prison, in 1993, of emphysema.

See also
 List of helicopter prison escapes

Bibliography

Aviation accidents and incidents in the United States in 1978
Aircraft hijackings in the United States
Accidents and incidents involving the McDonnell Douglas DC-9
Crimes in Louisville, Kentucky
Hostage taking in the United States
541
Airliner accidents and incidents in Illinois
Airliner accidents and incidents in Kentucky
1978 in Kentucky
December 1978 events in the United States
Terrorist incidents in the United States in 1978